An election to Somerset County Council took place on 2 May 2013 as part of the 2013 United Kingdom local elections. 55 councillors were elected from 54 electoral divisions, which returned one county councillor each with the exception of the two-member Glastonbury & Street division. Members were elected by the first-past-the-post voting system for a four-year term of office. The electoral divisions were changed from those used at the previous election in 2009, reducing the number of county councillors from 58 to 55 from this election. No elections were held in North Somerset or Bath and North East Somerset, which are unitary authorities outside the area covered by the County Council.

The Conservative Party retained control of the council, despite having their majority reduced. They won 28 of the 54 seats contested on 2 May, in addition to the division of Coker, where the election was delayed until 16 May due to the death of one of the candidates.

All locally registered electors (British, Irish, Commonwealth and European Union citizens) who were aged 18 or over on Thursday 2 May 2013 were entitled to vote in the local elections. Those who were temporarily away from their ordinary address (for example, away working, on holiday, in student accommodation or in hospital) were also entitled to vote in the local elections, although those who had moved abroad and registered as overseas electors cannot vote in the local elections. It is possible to register to vote at more than one address (such as a university student who had a term-time address and lives at home during holidays) at the discretion of the local Electoral Register Office, but it remains an offence to vote more than once in the same local government election.

Overall results

|}

Results by division

Bishops Hull & Taunton West

Blackdown & Neroche

Blackmoor Vale

 Note: Alex Wood's candidature was suspended shortly before the elections, due to photos which appeared on his private Facebook account, showing him making a Nazi-style salute and with a knife in his teeth.

Brent

Bridgwater East & Bawdrip

Bridgwater North & Central

Bridgwater South

The nomination of Judith Kendall (Liberal Democrats) was ruled as invalid

Bridgwater West

Brympton

Burnham on Sea North

Cannington

David Wilson (UK Independence Party) was withdrawn as a candidate before the close of nominations

Castle Cary

Chard North

Chard South

Cheddar

Coker

Election was deferred until 16 May 2013, due to the death of the original UK Independence Party candidate, Audrey Spencer

Comeytrowe & Trull

Crewkerne

Curry Rivel & Langport

Dulverton & Exmoor

Dunster

Frome East

Frome North

Frome West

Glastonbury & Street

Highbridge & Burnham South

Huntspill

Ilminster

King Alfred

Lydeard

Martock

Mendip Central & East

Mendip Hills

Mendip South

Mendip West

Minehead

Monkton & North Curry

North Petherton

Rowbarton & Staplegrove

Shepton Mallet

Somerton

South Petherton and Islemoor

Taunton East

Taunton North

Taunton South

Upper Tone

Watchet & Stogursey

Wellington

Wells

Wincanton & Bruton

Yeovil Central

Yeovil East

Yeovil South

Yeovil West

References

2013
2013 English local elections
2010s in Somerset